Louisy Mathieu (17 June 1817 in Basse-Terre, Guadeloupe – 4 November 1874 in Basse-Terre) was a politician from Guadeloupe who served in the French Constituent Assembly from 1848–1849 as a Montagnard. He is the first freed slave to sit in the Constituent Assembly.

Mathieu was a print-worker representing Pointe-a-Pitre. His first speech spoke about his wish for a better relationship between blacks and whites in the colonies, but it was received poorly by the assembly and he served only one term after losing his seat in the subsequent election.

Gallery

See also 
 Jean-Baptiste Belley

References 

1817 births
1874 deaths
People from Basse-Terre
Guadeloupean politicians
French republicans
Members of the 1848 Constituent Assembly
Guadeloupean slaves
Black French politicians
French abolitionists